Turquoise is a blue-green color, based on the mineral of the same name. The word turquoise dates to the 17th century and is derived from the French , meaning 'Turkish', because the mineral was first brought to Europe through Turkey from mines in the historical Khorasan province of Iran (Persia) and Afghanistan today . The first recorded use of turquoise as a color name in English was in 1573.

The X11 color named turquoise is displayed on the right.

Turquoise gemstones

Turquoise is an opaque, blue-to-green mineral that is a hydrous phosphate of copper and aluminium, with the chemical formula CuAl6(PO4)4(OH)8·4H2O. It is rare and valuable in finer grades and has been prized as a gem and ornamental stone for thousands of years owing to its unique hue.

In many cultures of the Old and New Worlds, this gemstone has been esteemed for thousands of years as a holy stone, a bringer of good fortune or a talisman. The oldest evidence for this claim was found in ancient Egypt, where grave furnishings with turquoise inlay were discovered, dating from approximately 3000 BCE. In the ancient Persian Empire, the sky-blue gemstones were earlier worn round the neck or wrist as protection against unnatural death. If they changed color, the wearer was thought to have reason to fear the approach of doom. Meanwhile, it has been discovered that turquoise can change color. The change can be caused by light, or by a chemical reaction brought about by cosmetics, dust, or the acidity of the skin.

Turquoise is a stone and color that is strongly associated with the domes and interiors of large mosques in Iran, Central Asia, and Russia.

Variations

Celeste

The color Celeste is a sky bluish turquoise.

Light turquoise

Light turquoise is a lighter tone of turquoise.

Turquoise blue

Turquoise blue is a color close to turquoise on the color wheel, but slightly more bluish.

The first recorded use of turquoise blue as a color name in English was in 1900.

Medium turquoise

At right is displayed the web color medium turquoise.

Dark turquoise

At right is displayed the web color dark turquoise.

Bright turquoise

At right is displayed the color bright turquoise.

See also

References

Color
Shades of blue
Shades of cyan
Shades of green